The spot-winged antshrike (Pygiptila stellaris) is a species of bird in the family Thamnophilidae. It is monotypic within the genus Pygiptila. It is found in Bolivia, Brazil, Colombia, Ecuador, French Guiana, Peru, Suriname, and Venezuela, where its natural habitat is subtropical or tropical moist lowland forests.

The spot-winged antshrike was described and illustrated by the German naturalist Johann Baptist von Spix in 1825 and given the binomial name Thamnophilus stellaris. The current genus Pygiptila was erected by the English zoologist Philip Sclater in 1858.

References

spot-winged antshrike
Birds of the Amazon Basin
Birds of the Guianas
spot-winged antshrike
Taxonomy articles created by Polbot